This is a list of star systems within 30–35 light years of Earth.

See also
 Lists of stars
 List of star systems within 25-30 light-years
 List of star systems within 35-40 light-years
 List of nearest stars and brown dwarfs

References

star systems within 30-35 light-years
Star systems
star systems within 30-35 light-years